Lactarius rufus is a common, medium-sized member of the mushroom genus Lactarius, whose many members are commonly known as milkcaps. Known by the common name of the rufous milkcap, or the red hot milk cap in North America. It is dark brick red in color, and grows with pine or birch trees.

Taxonomy
Described originally by Giovanni Antonio Scopoli, and later by the Swedish father of modern mycology Elias Magnus Fries. The specific epithet rufus is a reference to its colour.

Description
It is dark brick, bay, or red-brown. At first it is convex, and often has a small central boss (umbo), but later flattens, eventually acquiring a shallow central depression. The surface is dry and matt. The concolorous, but paler  stem  often becomes hollow with age. The gills are slightly decurrent, cream, becoming coloured as the cap later, only paler. The spore print is creamy white, with a slight salmon tinge. The flesh is white, as is the (abundant) milk, which tastes mild initially, gradually becoming very hot, and acrid after a minute or so.

Distribution and habitat
Lactarius rufus appears from late spring to late autumn. It is frequent in the northern temperate zones in Europe and North America.  It is most commonly found with pine trees, but can also appear with birch, conifer, or spruce. It is common in northern California, and the Pacific Northwest from late summer to early winter.

Edibility
Lactarius rufus is generally not recommended for consumption, even being considered poisonous due to the presence of toxins which may cause gastric upset. However, it is used in some places as a condiment after special treatment, and mycologist David Arora notes that it is eaten in Scandinavian countries after canning, and also mentions that there may be edibility differences in North American and European versions of the mushroom.  It is one of the most common wild mushrooms harvested for food in Finland.

See also
List of Lactarius species

References

External links

rufus
Fungi of North America
Fungi of Europe